This is a list of electoral results for the Southern Province in Victorian state elections.

Members for Southern Province

Election results

Elections in the 1960s

Elections in the 1950s

References

Victoria (Australia) state electoral results by district